Domen Lorbek (born March 6, 1985) is a Slovenian professional basketball player for KK Zlatorog Laško of the Slovenian League. He also represented the Slovenian national basketball team internationally. Standing at 1.99 m (6 ft 6.25 in), he primarily plays the shooting guard position, but can also play as small forward. He is a younger brother of Erazem Lorbek and older brother of Klemen Lorbek.

Professional career
Lorbek has played with Ježica, Triglav Kranj, Helios Domžale, Union Olimpija, Estudiantes Madrid, Benetton Treviso and Lagun Aro.

On February 10, 2022, Lorbek signed with KK Zlatorog Laško.

Slovenian national team
Lorbek competed for the senior Slovenian national basketball team at the 2007 FIBA European Championship, Olympic Qualifying Tournament 2008 and 2009 FIBA European Championship.

Awards and accomplishments

Krka 
 Slovenian Supercup Champion: 2012
 Slovenian Supercup MVP: 2012
 Slovenian Champion: 2012–2013

Olimpija 
 Slovenian Champion: 2017–2018

References

External links

 Domen Lorbek at ABALiga.com
 Domen Lorbek at Euroleague.net
 Domen Lorbek at TBLStat.net

1985 births
Living people
ABA League players
CB Estudiantes players
Gaziantep Basketbol players
Gipuzkoa Basket players
KK Krka players
KK Igokea players
KK Olimpija players
Liga ACB players
Pallacanestro Cantù players
Pallacanestro Treviso players
Real Betis Baloncesto players
S.S. Felice Scandone players
Sportspeople from Kranj
Shooting guards
Slovenian expatriate basketball people in Italy
Slovenian expatriate basketball people in Spain
Slovenian men's basketball players
Small forwards
2014 FIBA Basketball World Cup players
Helios Suns players